Henri Grimal (19 July 1910 – 3 November 2012) was a 20th-century French writer and historian, a specialist of the British Empire, the Commonwealth of Nations and the history of decolonisation. Agrégé d'histoire (1939), he taught at the lycée Janson-de-Sailly, the lycée Henri-IV, the lycée Louis-le-Grand, the Sorbonne, as well as at Princeton University.

Works (selection) 
 1948: Derrière les barricades, Éditions Bourrelier
 1956: Agricola, de Tacite, Éditions Hachette
 1962: Le Commonwealth, Presses universitaires de France
 1962: Histoire du Commonwealth britannique, Presses universitaires de France
 1965: La Décolonisation, 1919-1963, Librairie Armand Colin, prix Broquette-Gonin of the Académie Française (1966) (reprints in 1967, 1970, 1985 and 1999 , and in 1978 by Westview Press: Decolonialization : the British, Dutch, French and Belgian Empires: 1919-1963)
 1971: De l'Empire britannique au Commonwealth, Librairie Armand Colin (rééd. 1999). 

Henri Grimal also published in 2005 the first volume of his souvenirs: L'Envol, at Presses de l'université des Sciences sociales de Toulouse, an account of his young years in the region of his native village in the 1920s.

References

External links 
 Henri Grimal, La décolonisation, de 1919 à 1963. (compte rendu) on Persée 
  Decolonization: The British, French, Dutch and Belgian Empires, 1919-1963 by Henri Grimal on JSTOR

Winners of the Prix Broquette-Gonin (literature)
20th-century French historians
People from Aveyron
1910 births
2012 deaths
French centenarians
Men centenarians